Associazione Sportiva Dilettantistica Igea 1946 is an Italian association football club, based in Barcellona Pozzo di Gotto, Sicily. Currently it plays in Eccellenza.

History

From Igea Virtus to F.C. Igea Virtus Barcellona 

The club was founded in 1946 as Igea Virtus and refounded in 1964 as Associazione Sportiva Nuova Igea, and changed to Football Club Igea Virtus Barcellona in 1993 after the merger with Barcellona.

In July 2010 the club folded after the relegation from Lega Pro Seconda Divisione.

A.S.D. Igea Virtus Barcellona 
In the summer of 2011, the club was refounded as Associazione Sportiva Dilettantistica Igea Virtus Barcellona after the merger between the teams of Giovanile Calcio Igea and that of Taormina Trappitello (acquiring its sports title of Prima Categoria Sicily) getting the immediate promotion to Promozione Sicily. The club also won the Coppa Sicily of Prima Categoria.

A.S.D. Igea 1946 
After the folding of the original club in 2019, it was refounded once again, by means of relocation of Terme Vigliatore, a nearby Promozione team, to Barcellona, under the new denomination of A.S.D. Igea 1946. Under this new structure, the club was promoted back to Eccellenza in 2020.

Colors and badge 

The team's colors are yellow and red.

Stadium 
The club, more predominantly known as Igea or Barcellona, plays at the Stadio Carlo D'Alcontres.

References

External links 
Official website

 
Football clubs in Italy
Football clubs in Sicily
Association football clubs established in 1946
Serie C clubs
1946 establishments in Italy